William Krupke was a physicist at the Lawrence Livermore National Laboratory in Livermore, California. He was named a Fellow of the Institute of Electrical and Electronics Engineers (IEEE) in 2016 for his research in laser science and technology.

References

Fellow Members of the IEEE
Living people
Year of birth missing (living people)
Place of birth missing (living people)
Lawrence Livermore National Laboratory staff
American electrical engineers